

Geography and Climate
Murali Bhanjyang is a suburb in  Nilkantha Municipality in Dhading District in the Bagmati Zone of central Nepal. The formerly Village development committee was merged to form municipality on 18 May 2014 merging along with Nilkantha, Sunaula Bazar, Murali Bhanjyang, Sangkosh Village development committees.

Population
At the Census of 2011, this Village Development Committee has 7,253 inhabitants and 1,673 households. Among them there are 3,277 males and 3,976 females.

Rivers

Religious and touristic attractions
This Village Development Committee has many places for religious purposes as well as for tourism.

References 

Populated places in Dhading District